BBC Radio 1's Live Lounge 2014 is a compilation album consisting of live tracks played on Fearne Cotton's BBC Radio 1 show, both cover versions and original songs. The album was released on 27 October 2014, and is the tenth in the series of Live Lounge albums.

Track listing

References 

2014 compilation albums
2014 live albums
Live Lounge
Covers albums
Rhino Entertainment compilation albums
Sony Music compilation albums
Universal Music Group compilation albums
Universal Music TV albums